Maria of Nassau may refer to:
Maria of Nassau (1539–1599), daughter of William the Rich and Juliana of Stolberg
Maria of Nassau (1553–1554), first daughter of William the Silent and Anna of Egmond
Maria of Nassau (1556–1616), second daughter of William the Silent and Anna of Egmond
Maria of Nassau (1568–1625), daughter of John VI, Count of Nassau-Dillenburg and Elisabeth of Leuchtenberg
Maria of Nassau (1642–1688), daughter of Frederick Henry, Prince of Orange and Amalia of Solms-Braunfels